French-born chef Roland Passot, owner of La Folie and the more casual, Left Bank Brasseries, was named one of "the eight wonders of Bay Area dining" by San Francisco Chronicle lead critic Michael Bauer.

Early life and career
Passot was born in 1955 in Villefranche-sur-Saône, in France's Rhône-Alpes.  He is a classically trained French chef, having attended cooking school in Lyon while beginning as an assistant, at age fourteen, in the city's Léon de Lyon restaurant under Chef Paul Lacombe, and then Pierre Orsi Restaurant.   After Passot rose to the rank of assistant sous-chef at Léon de Lyon, Jean Banchet (who Passot considers his most important influence) recruited him in 1979 to work at Le Francais in Wheeling, Illinois (near Chicago, Illinois | Chicago), then sent him in 1981 to open the French Room at the Adolphus Hotel in Dallas, Texas (He was fired from the French Room after getting into a shouting match with its maitre d').  In between, he opened Le Castel in San Francisco.

Restaurants 
Passot opened La Folie on Polk Street in 1988, with his wife Jamie and brother Georges.  A small brasserie in the Polk Gulch section of the Russian Hill neighborhood of San Francisco, it opened at a cost of $45,000 with no outside investors.  His wife conceived the name, which means "craziness" or "folly" in French, referring to the difficulty of opening a new establishment in San Francisco's competitive restaurant scene.  Still a family business, his brother serves as sommelier, and his wife as general manager.

Instantly successful, La Folie steadily gained in reputation and refinement until by 2000 it was one of only several restaurants in the San Francisco Bay Area, California, to earn a "four star" review from the San Francisco Chronicle, from the city's most recognized food critic.  It still had that distinction as of 2008.  Avoiding "fusion" influences, the establishment is a conventional contemporary French restaurant, with classic French use of stocks and sauces but lighter than traditional French and with attention to local ingredients.

Passot, Levine join forces to open Left Bank in 1994, with partner Ed Levine, a Stanford Business School graduate who had been CFO of the Il Fornaio chain, Passot opened the much larger (220 seat) Left Bank restaurant in Larkspur, California, as a more casual alternative to La Folie.  The second Left Bank opened in Menlo Park, California in 1998, and then San Jose in 2003.  Left Banks are warm, vibrant brasseries offering quality French-inspired cuisine. The restaurants serve a style of home-style cooking Passot calls "Cuisine Grand-mere".  In 2009 the Left Bank restaurant group opened LB Steak, a modern American Steakhouse, in San Jose's premier Santana Row. LB Steak is a casually elegant American Steakhouse reflecting the distinctive charm of Santana Row's surroundings and neighbors. Featuring USDA Prime Beef, they are known for a diverse selection of 10 prime steaks and Sunday night Prime Rib dinners.

Influence and awards

In style, Passot favors contemporary French cuisine, avoiding fusion, molecular gastronomy, and new devices or techniques such as sous vide.  Passot has a reputation for hiring and mentoring young academy-trained chefs.  A number of successful restaurant chefs credit Passot as a mentor, or as inspiration, including Richard Reddington, the Michelin starred Chef of REDD in Yountville, CA. Jeffrey Russell, Executive Chef at The Grand America Hotel in Salt Lake City, Trey Foshee of George's at the Cove in La Jolla, California, and Michael Kramer, formerly of McCrady's Restaurant in Charleston, South Carolina and (as of 2008) of Voice Restaurant in Houston, Texas

In 1991 Passot was inducted into the Maitres Cuisiniers de France. His restaurant won the Zagat Survey awards for "Best Food" and "Best Nouvelle French restaurant" in 1998, and "Best French restaurant" in San Francisco, in 2002.  He also earned a James Beard Award as "best rising star chef" of 1980, and other "best" designations and awards from USA Today, Food & Wine Magazine, Gourmet magazine, Gault Millau, and SF Weekly.  In 2001 the French Government awarded him the "Chevalier dans l’Ordre du Mèrite Agricole".

A local caviar producer, Tsar Nicoulai, has named a product after him.

Personal life
Passot met his wife, Jamie, when she was working at the Four Seasons Resort in Irving, Texas.  They have two kids, Charlotte and Jean Paul. Known for being gregarious and social, Passot is a frequent participant in cooking shows and demonstrations, charity events, and television appearances.  After gaining weight from the stress of managing his restaurants, he lost 60 pounds by eliminating alcohol, sugar, and starches from his diet.

References

External links 
 lafolie.com - official La Folie site
 leftbank.com - official Left Bank site
 tanglewood.com - official Tanglewood site

1955 births
French chefs
Living people
American chefs
People from Villefranche-sur-Saône
People from San Francisco
Cuisine of the San Francisco Bay Area
Knights of the Order of Agricultural Merit
Chefs from San Francisco